William Weir may refer to:

 William Alexander Weir (1858–1929), Quebec lawyer and politician
 William Weir (architect) (1865–1950), Scottish restorer of historic buildings
 William Weir, 1st Viscount Weir (1877–1959), Scottish industrialist
 William Weir, 3rd Viscount Weir (born 1933), British peer and businessman
 William Gilbert Weir (1896–1971), Canadian politician
 Bill Weir (born 1967), co-anchor of Good Morning America Weekend Edition
 Bill Weir (footballer), Australian rules footballer
 William Weir (aviator) (1891–?), World War I flying ace
 William Weir (trade unionist) (1868–?), British coal miner and politician